The Monster of London City is a 1964 West German krimi crime film directed by Edwin Zbonek and starring Hansjörg Felmy, Marianne Koch, and Dietmar Schönherr.

The film's sets were designed by the art directors Hans Jürgen Kiebach and Ernst Schomer. It was shot at the Spandau Studios in Berlin and on location around London.

Synopsis
A series of Jack the Ripper-style murders take place in contemporary London, leaving Scotland Yard baffled. Coincidentally, a new play about Jack the Ripper is opening in London at the time, and the lead actor who plays Jack becomes a suspect in the real-life killings.

Cast
 Hansjörg Felmy as Richard Sand
 Marianne Koch as Ann Morlay
 Dietmar Schönherr as Dr. Morely Greely / Michael
 Hans Nielsen as Dorne
 Chariklia Baxevanos as Betty Ball
 Fritz Tillmann as Sir George
 Walter Pfeil as Horrlick
 Peer Schmidt as Teddy Flynn
 Kurd Pieritz as Maylor
 Elsa Wagner as Housekeeper
 Adelheid Hinz as Maid
 Gerda Blisse as Assistant
 Manfred Grote as Detective
 Kai Fischer as Helen Capstick
 Gudrun Schmidt as Evelyn Nichols

References

Bibliography
 Robert C. Reimer & Reinhard Zachau. German Culture through Film: An Introduction to German Cinema. Hackett Publishing, 2017.

External links
 

1964 films
1964 crime films
German crime films
West German films
1960s German-language films
Films directed by Edwin Zbonek
Films set in London
Films shot at Spandau Studios
1960s German films